The Roman Catholic Metropolitan Archdiocese of Kuala Lumpur is an ecclesiastical territory or diocese of the Roman Catholic Church in Malaysia. It was erected as the Diocese of Kuala Lumpur by Pope Pius XII on 25 February 1955, and was elevated to the rank of a Metropolitan Archdiocese on 18 December 1972, with the suffragan sees of Malacca-Johor and Penang. It also administers the capital of Malaysia, Federal Territory of Kuala Lumpur and the states of Selangor, Negeri Sembilan, Pahang, Terengganu. The archdiocese's Mother Church and thus, seat of its Archbishop, is St. John's Cathedral. It was one of the three Roman Catholic archdioceses in Malaysia, with the ecclesiastical archdioceses of Kota Kinabalu and Kuching.

History
In 1786, the first church was established in Penang. This led to the formation of Vicariate of Siam and Kedah, which expanded towards the entire Malayan Peninsula and Singapore. The Vicariate of Malaya was formed in 1841. The Church of Visitation was founded in 1848 in Seremban, Negeri Sembilan. This is the first known church to be erected in central Malaya. A historical moment was made in 1888, when the Diocese of Malacca was formed. The first church in Kuala Lumpur was dedicated to St John the evangelist in 1883, and would be later known as St. John's Cathedral, the Mother Church of Kuala Lumpur.

In 1955, the Diocese of Malacca became a Metropolitan Archdiocese, with the newly formed Diocese of Penang and Diocese of Kuala Lumpur as its suffragan sees. Bishop Dominic Vendargon was appointed as the first Bishop of Kuala Lumpur, and was ordained in the same year. In 1972, the Diocese of Kuala Lumpur was elevated into an Archdiocese, with the suffragan dioceses of Penang and Malacca-Johor.

In 1983, Archbishop Dominic Vendargon retired. Bishop Anthony Soter Fernandez of Penang was appointed as the 2nd Archbishop of Kuala Lumpur. When he retired in 2003, he was succeeded by Archbishop Murphy Pakiam who was then the Auxiliary Bishop. On 3 July 2014, the Vatican appointed Most Rev Julian Leow as the 4th Archbishop of Kuala Lumpur, after the resignation of Archbishop Emeritus Murphy Pakiam was accepted by Pope Francis in December 2013. During the consistory on 19 November 2016, Pope Francis installed Archbishop Emeritus Anthony Soter Fernandez as a cardinal, making him the first Bishop from Malaysia to be appointed.

Statistical summary
Below are statistics of the archdiocese.
 Area of territory - 63,763 km2
 Approximate total population - 10,421,600
 Estimate Catholic population - 134,000
 Churches - 36
 Chapels & Mass Centres - 49
 Clergy - Bishops: 3, Diocesan Priests: 49, Religious Priests: 10, Deacon: 1
 Religious Sisters - 102
 Religious Brothers - 17
 Educational Institutions - Nursing College: 1, Secondary Schools: 15, Primary Schools: 32, Kindergartens: 21
 Charitable and Social Institutions - Hospital: 1, Home of Aged: 2, Counselling Centres: 3

Bishops 
The following are the lists of ordinaries (bishops of the diocese) and auxiliary bishops, and their terms of service.

Bishop of Kuala Lumpur 
 Dominic Aloysius Vendargon (1955–1972), elevated to Archbishop

Archbishops of Kuala Lumpur 
 Dominic Aloysius Vendargon (1972–1983)
 Anthony Soter Fernandez (1983–2003)
 Murphy Nicholas Xavier Pakiam (2003–2013)
 Julian Leow Beng Kim (2014–present)

Former Auxiliary Bishops of Kuala Lumpur 
 Antony Selvanayagam (1980–1983), appointed Bishop of Penang
 Murphy Nicholas Xavier Pakiam (1995–2003), appointed Archbishop of this diocese

Awards and recognition
 2016 The Fisher's Net Awards - Best Diocesan Use of New Media

See also
 Catholic Church in Malaysia
 List of Catholic dioceses in Malaysia, Singapore and Brunei
 List of Catholic dioceses (structured view)-Episcopal Conference of Malaysia, Singapore and Brunei

References

External links

 
 Archdiocese of Kuala Lumpur Catechesis website on Archive.org
 Archdiocese of Kuala Lumpur on catholic-hierarchy.org
 Archdiocese of Kuala Lumpur on gcatholic.org

1955 establishments in Malaya
Christian organizations established in 1955
Religion in Kuala Lumpur
Kuala Lumpur
Kuala Lumpur